"Menschen, die ihr wart verloren" (German, literally: Humans, you who were lost) is a German Christmas carol. It became part of several regional versions of the Catholic hymnal Gotteslob in 1975, but was included in the common section (Stammteil) in the current Gotteslob in 2013, as GL 245 in four stanzas, the former stanzas 1, 5, 8 and 9.

The first stanza addresses humans who were lost, telling them to live up and be joyful, because God became equal to men ("den Menschen gleich"). The refrain calls them to give thanks by singing "Glory to God in the highest", alluding to the Annunciation. The second stanza reflects the mystery of the Creator as a helpless child, the third stanza names love as the reason for this act, and the final stanza calls to love him in return.

Melody 

Source: Text and melody: Christoph Bernhard Verspoell, Münster 1810.

 composed a different melody when he included Verspoell's text in his Christmas oratorio Weihnachtsoratorium, Op. 5.

References 

 Gesänge beim römischkatholischen Gottesdienste, nebst angehängtem Gebethbuche, hrsg. von C. B. Verspoell, Aschendorff, Münster 1829: p. 18, p. 19, p. 20

External links 

 Deutsches Liturgisches Institut: »Menschen, die ihr wart verloren« (GL 245)
 
 

German-language Christmas carols
Catholic hymns in German
1810 songs
19th-century hymns in German